Le Centre d’Art, also known as Centre d’Art d'Haïti, is an art center, art school and art gallery located in Port-au-Prince, Haiti. It was founded in 1944 by American watercolorist DeWitt Peters and several prominent Haitians from the intellectual and cultural circles. In 2010, the center's building was destroyed; by 2012 they continued offering classes; and the center's new building is scheduled to reopen by 2021.

History 
The institution was at the center of what became known as the Haitian Art Movement, educating and exhibiting founding artists including Albert Mangones, Gerald Bloncourt, Maurice Borno, Rigaud Benoit, Hector Hyppolite, Daniel Lafontant, Marie-Josée Nadal, Rose-Marie Desruisseaux, and Luce Turnier.

Le Centre d’Art was destroyed in the 2010 earthquake and many artworks from its collection was damaged. The Smithsonian Institution as well as several other local and international organisations has since collaborated with recovery and conservation efforts.  The center has continued their art classes and workshops starting in 2012. In December 2019, Le Centre d’Art purchased a large gingerbread mansion in the area of Pacot, Port-au-Prince. The purchase was made possible with donors such as Fondation de France. The center is planning to open at the new location in 2021.

References

External links 
 Official website

Haitian art
Port-au-Prince
Organizations established in 1944